is a Japanese 2018 youth sports drama film written and directed by Norihiro Koizumi and starring Suzu Hirose, Shūhei Nomura and Mackenyu Arata.  It is the third and final installment of the live action film adaptations of the manga series Chihayafuru, written and illustrated by Yuki Suetsugu. It was first announced at Sanuki Film Festival 2017.

Plot

Cast
Suzu Hirose as Chihaya Ayase
Shūhei Nomura as Taichi Mashima 
Mackenyu Arata as Arata Wataya
Mone Kamishiraishi as Kanade Ōe
Yūma Yamoto as Yūsei Nishida
Yūki Morinaga as Tsutomu Komano
Hiroya Shimizu as Akihito Sudō
Mio Yūki as Sumire Hanano
Kaya Kiyohara as Iori Wagatsuma
Ichika Osaki as Sae
Hayato Sano as Akihiro Tsukuba 
Mayu Matsuoka as Shinobu Wakamiya
Kento Kaku as Hisashi Suo
Miyuki Matsuda as Taeko Miyauchi
Jun Kunimura as Harada Hideo

References

External links
 

2010s teen drama films
2010s Japanese films
Nippon TV films
Films directed by Norihiro Koizumi
Films set in Tokyo
Live-action films based on manga
Japanese high school films
Japanese teen drama films
Toho films
2018 drama films
2010s high school films